Marie-Florentine Roger (in some sources Royer, 1869-?), better known by her English-sounding model name Sarah Brown, probably an affectation due to her Celtic-looking long red hair and pale skin, was a French artist's model famous as the "Queen of Bohemia" in 1890s Paris. 

Roger's arrest, along with three other well known artists' models for posing scantily clad as part of tableau vivant floats at the 1893 Bal des Quat'z'Arts in Paris' Latin Quarter, provoked one of the most famous student riots of the late nineteenth century. 

Roger modeled for Jules Lefebrve, Georges Rochegrosse, and Frederick MacMonnies, among many others.  She named as "Lily White" in the autobiography of sculptor Janet Scudder, in which the two women have a confrontation.

References

1869 births
Year of death unknown
Date of death unknown
French artists' models